Starstealer is an album released in 2009 by an Estonian industrial metal band No-Big-Silence.

The first single is "Chain Me".

Track listing
Lyics written by Cram; music written by Willem.

 "Chain Me" – 4:18
 "Starstealer" – 4:46
 "505 Signs of Chaos" – 4:24
 "Kiss the Beast" – 4:50
 "Plastic Cabaret" – 3:45
 "Radioactive Paradise" – 3:34
 "The Bone Man" – 4:25
 "Flashback" – 4:02
 "Neuropathic Pain Control" – 4:19
 "Cut the Cord" – 5:07

Personnel
Vocals - Cram
Bass, backing vocals, guitar - Willem
Guitar, mandolin, keyboards and programming - Kristo Kotkas
Drums - Rainer Mere
Editing, mixing - Kristo Kotkas
Producing - No-Big-Silence
Mastering - Kristo Kotkas
Additional vocals and voices - Kaire Vilgats, Iiris, Vicky OS X, Sethh 
Artwork - Taavi Oolberg
Layout - Taavi Oolberg and Cram
Photos - Veiko Kallas, Erik Riikoja

2009 albums
No-Big-Silence albums